Ketevan Dumbadze (born 11 January 1961) is a Georgian art critic and politician. Since 2020, she has been a member of the Parliament of Georgia of the 10th convocation by party list, election bloc: „Georgian Dream - Democratic Georgia“.

References

People from Georgia (country)
1961 births
Living people